Raiford is a surname. Notable people with the surname include:

Conrad L. Raiford (1907–2002), American athlete and police officer
Robert D. Raiford (1927–2017), American radio broadcaster and actor
Rudolph Douglas Raiford (1922–2002), American WWII veteran and lawyer